Brigady 3 is a rural locality (a settlement) in Politotdelskoye Rural Settlement, Nikolayevsky District, Volgograd Oblast, Russia. The population was 96 as of 2010. There are 3 streets.

Geography 
Brigady 3 is located in steppe on the left bank of the Volgograd Reservoir, 14 km east of Nikolayevsk (the district's administrative centre) by road. Leninskoye is the nearest rural locality.

References 

Rural localities in Nikolayevsky District, Volgograd Oblast